The premier of Alberta is the first minister for the Canadian province of Alberta, and the province's head of government. The current premier is Danielle Smith, leader of the United Conservative Party, who was sworn in on October 11, 2022.

The premier of the province deals with specific areas relating to Alberta and Alberta's relation on the national scene. The premier acts as a representative for the Legislative Assembly of Alberta and the Members of the Legislative Assembly (MLA) are in turn the representatives of the people of Alberta.

Duties and functions
To be effective, accountable and in line with custom, the premier is expected to hold a seat in the legislature, so the premier serves as the MLA for a riding and is elected as MLA by the constituents of that constituency. As with most government leaders in a parliamentary system, the premier usually wins his or her own election as MLA easily. However, on occasion, a premier has not been re-elected to their seat in a general election, forcing them to run in a by-election in a constituency that comes empty by the resignation of the sitting MLA or other incident. The most recent case of this was Don Getty, who lost his Edmonton-Whitemud seat in the 1989 election and then ran and was elected in a by-election in Stettler. In 2022 Danielle Smith was elected party leader without holding a seat in the legislative assembly, thus becoming premier, and within a few weeks won a seat in a by-election.

The premier of Alberta's responsibilities include administering provincial laws, enacting legislation, and regulating industry. The premier is responsible for promoting Alberta's interests via the federal government and serves as the chief representative of Alberta to the rest of Canada.

List of premiers

References